Coleophora quadrifariella is a moth of the family Coleophoridae. It is found in Russia (Volga region) and Kazakhstan.

References

quadrifariella
Moths of Europe
Moths of Asia
Moths described in 1880